The 2017 CONMEBOL South American Under-20 Beach Soccer Championship was the first edition of the South American Under-20 Beach Soccer Championship (known natively in Spanish as the Sudamericano Sub-20 Futbol Playa), an international youth beach soccer tournament for South American national teams of men under the age of 20. 

The championship was organised by CONMEBOL, the governing body for football in South America, in cooperation with the local organisers, the Uruguayan Football Federation (AUF). Confirmed in December 2015, the event took place between 3 and 10 December in Montevideo, Uruguay.

Brazil won the inaugural championship, beating Argentina on penalties in the final to become under-20 South American champions.

Teams
Under 20s teams representing all 10 members of CONMEBOL took part.

Squads
Each team submitted a squad consisting of 12 players, of individuals no older than 20 years.

Venue
One venue was used to host all matches in the capital city of Montevideo, on Pocitos Beach, in the district of Pocitos.

Note  Correct as of 2011.

Draw
The draw to split the ten teams into two groups of five took place on November 1 at 19:00 UYT (UTC–3) in Montevideo, Uruguay at the headquarters of the Uruguayan Football Association.

Initially, two teams were automatically assigned to the groups:

to Group A: as the host association, 
to Group B: the highest ranked team in the last U-20 tournament, 

The remaining eight teams were split into four pots of two, shown in the below table.

The teams were seeded based on how many points they gained in the last U-20 tournament, the Liga Sudamericana; those with the most points were placed in Pot 1 as the highest seeds, down to the lowest seeds in Pot 4 who collected the fewest points. From each pot, one team was drawn into Group A and the other team was drawn into Group B.

Group stage
The match schedule was revealed on 1 November, after the completion of the draw.

All times are local, UYT (UTC–3).

Group A

Group B

Placement matches
The teams finishing in third, fourth and fifth place in the groups were knocked out of title-winning contention, receding to play in consolation matches to determine 5th through 10th place in the final standings.

Ninth place play-off

Seventh place play-off

Fifth place play-off

Knockout stage
The group winners and runners-up progressed to the knockout stage to continue to compete for the title.

Semi-finals

Third place play-off

Final

Awards

Winners trophy

Individual awards

Top goalscorers
Players with 5 or more goals

20 goals

 Carlos Benítez

12 goals

 Lucas Ponzetti

8 goals

 Daniel Duran
 Juan Esteban Castrillon 
 Luis Enrique Molina
 Raphael Silva

6 goals

 Savio
 Facundo Cordero

5 goals

 Ivan Marcelo Araya
 Oscar Alarcon
 Christian Diaz
 Michael Loor

Source

Final standings

References

External links
CONMEBOL, official website
Campeonato Sudamericano Sub-20 Futbol Playa , at Beach Soccer Worldwide
Sudamericano Sub-20 (@Playasub20uy), official Twitter

 
Under-20 Beach Soccer Championship
2017 in Uruguayan football
2017 in beach soccer
South American Under-20 Beach Soccer